Marylou is the second studio album by Swiss singer-songwriter Anna Rossinelli. The album was released on 3 May 2013 by Universal Music. The first single from the album was "Let It Go" and it was released on 6 March 2013. The album was re-released under the new title Marylou Two on 4 February 2014, with the bonus tracks "Shine in the Light", "Let It Go (Live)", "Vagabonds (Live)", "Reconcile" and "Shine In The Light (Piano Version)".

Singles
"Let It Go" was released as the album's lead single on 6 March 2013. "Shine in the Light" was released as the lead single from Marylou Two in February 2014.

Track listing

Chart performance

Marylou

Marylou Two

Release history

References

External links
 Official website
 Anna Rossinelli on Facebook
 Anna Rossinelli on Twitter

2013 albums
Anna Rossinelli albums